Vachon is a surname.

Vachon may also refer to:

Vachon (electoral district), a provincial riding in Quebec
Vachon River (Arnaud River tributary), a river in Nunavik, Quebec, Canada
Vachon family, a Canadian pro-wrestling family
The Vachon Brothers, a pro-wrestling tag team
Vachon Bakery, Canadian maker of snack pastries 
Father Vachon School, Pacific Heights, Saskatoon, Saskatchewan, Canada
Vachon Gallery, Seattle University, First Hill, Seattle, Washington State, USA; see List of museums in Seattle

See also